Cinema Speculation is a 2022 nonfiction book by American filmmaker Quentin Tarantino, published by Harper on November 1, 2022.

Background
Cinema Speculation is Tarantino's debut work of nonfiction and combines "film criticism, film theory, a feat of reporting, and wonderful personal history." The book is a collection of essays organized around "key American films from the 1970s" which Tarantino saw in his youth. It was inspired by the film writing of critic Pauline Kael.

Publication
The book was initially scheduled to be published on October 25, 2022; Cinema Speculation was published by Harper on November 1, 2022. It is the second book in a two-book deal Tarantino signed with HarperCollins in 2020. Tarantino will promote the book with a nationwide book tour. The book's cover features a photograph of Steve McQueen with director Sam Peckinpah on the set of the 1972 action crime thriller The Getaway.

Reception
Cinema Speculation received favorable reviews, with a cumulative "Rave" rating at the review aggregator website Book Marks, based on eleven book reviews from mainstream literary critics. The book debuted at number five on The New York Times nonfiction best-seller list for the week ending November 5, 2022. Kirkus Reviews gave the book a starred review, writing, "Whether you agree with his assessments or not, he provides the original reporting and insights only a veteran director would notice, and his engaging style makes it impossible to leave an essay without learning something." The Daily Telegraph reviewer Jasper Rees gave the book 3 out of 5 stars, writing, "At times it's like leafing through yellowing back issues of Screen International. At others you feel Tarantino would have made a brilliant Tinseltown gossip columnist."

References

2022 non-fiction books
American essay collections
Books of film criticism
Books of film theory
HarperCollins books
Works by Quentin Tarantino